The Trades Cup (also known as the Trades Challenge Cup or IFA Trades Challenge Cup) is an Indian football tournament held in Kolkata and organised by Indian Football Association. Incorporated in 1889, it is the second oldest football tournament in Asia and oldest football tournament in Kolkata. It is the traditional curtain raiser for the Kolkata football season.

History
The Trades Cup was instituted in 1889 by the trading community of Calcutta and was organised by the Dalhousie AC committee. It was the first open football tournament in India, where Indian, British, regimental and college clubs participated.

The first Indian club to win a match against a British team was Nagendra Prasad Sarbadhikari's Sovabazar Club. They won the opening match of the 1892 Trades Cup by defeating the East Surrey Regiment with the score of 2–1. The first Indian club to win the Trades Cup was the National Association who won the trophy in the 1900 edition. The Indian club from South Calcutta under the guidance of Manmatha Ganguly defeated the British side, Shibpur Engineering College on 11 August 1900 at the Shobhabazar Ground. Mohun Bagan completed a hat-trick of Trades Cup titles between 1906 and 1908, which enabled them to make their IFA Shield debut in 1909.

The Trades Cup was revived after not being held for 25 years in 2004 by the IFA. The tournament gives the Kolkata clubs outside the "Big Three" playing in the Premier and lower divisions the chance to field and organise their teams ahead of the start of their league season.

Results

See also 

 History of Indian football
 Football in Kolkata
 List of oldest football competitions

References

Further reading 

Bibliography

 

 

Dutta, P. L., Memoir of 'Father of Indian Football' Nagendraprasad Sarbadhikary (Calcutta: N. P. Sarbadhikary Memorial Committee, 1944) (hereafter Memoir)

Ghosh, Saurindra Kumar. Krira Samrat Nagendraprasad Sarbadhikary 1869–1940 (Calcutta: N. P. Sarbadhikary Memorial Committee, 1963) (hereafter Krira Samrat).

 
 

Others

From recreation to competition: Early history of Indian football . pp. 124–141. Published online: 6 Aug 2006. Taylor & Francis. Retrieved 30 June 2021.

Football cup competitions in India
Football competitions in Kolkata
1889 establishments in India
Recurring sporting events established in 1889